Subhasnee Luchmun Roy, popularly known as Rj Subhasnee, is a politician and former radio personality, serving as member of parliament. She has lastly worked at the Mauritius Broadcasting Corporation. She has been elected in constituency No.4 Port-Louis North-Montagne Longue during the Mauritian general elections of 2019 under the L'Alliance Morisien coalition which comprises political parties such as Militant Socialist Movement, Muvman Liberater and Plateforme Militante (Mauritius).

References

External links 
 

Mauritian politicians
Living people
Year of birth missing (living people)
Mauritian radio personalities
Mauritius Broadcasting Corporation